OD or Od may refer to:

Education
 Old Diocesan, a former pupil of Diocesan College
 Old Dunelmian, a former pupil of Durham School

Medicine
 Doctor of Optometry (O.D.)
 Osteochondritis dissecans, a medical disease affecting the joints of both humans and animals
 Overdose, the use of a drug in quantities greater than recommended

Music
 Oblivion Dust, a Japanese rock band
 One Direction, a British/Irish pop music band
 Orphei Drängar, a Swedish male choir
 O.D, a song by Sunna from the album One Minute Science (2000)
 Overly Dedicated, a 2010 mixtape by Kendrick Lamar
 The OD EP, a 2012 extended play by Danny Brown

Organizations
 Batik Air Malaysia (IATA airline code OD)
 Ordnungsdienst , a collaborationist organization in Nazi-occupied Poland
 Organization development

People and characters
 O.D. (musician), a member of Velcra
 Super OD, a Ghanaian actor
 O.D (Gatchaman Crowds), a character in the anime series Gatchaman Crowds

 Ód or Óðr, a Nordic god

Places
 Odisha, India
 Stormarn (district), Germany (vehicle plate code OD)

Science and technology
 Optical density
 Outside diameter (also: O.D.), cylinder or pipe external diameter
 Ordnance datum, in Britain, an Ordnance Survey data point
 od (Unix), a Unix program
 Object Desktop, a suite of skinning and customization programs by Stardock, or ObjectDock, another program by the same company
 Optical disc
 Organization development, the study of organizational change and performance
 Ordinal definable set, a set requiring only finitely-many ordinals to define under first-order logic.

Other uses 
 Od language, an Indo-Aryan language of Pakistan
 Odic force or Od, a life force
 Occupation Double, a Quebec reality show that started in 2003
 Official Declaration, part of Latter-day Saint scripture
 Olive drab, a color, particularly of some United States Army uniforms
 Online dating
 Original dance, the second part of an ice dancing competition
 Order of Distinction, a civil honour of Jamaica
 OD - original designation in Taxonomy

See also

 ODS (disambiguation)
 Oder (disambiguation)
 Odor (disambiguation)